The flag of Middlesex is the flag of the English county of Middlesex. It is the traditional flag of Middlesex, the historic county that forms the central and north-west parts of Greater London. This traditional design is included in the Flag Institute's registry of local flags as the Middlesex Flag.

On Middlesex Day in 2022, the Middlesex Flag became the first county flag to fly over 10 Downing Street, the official residence of the Prime Minister of the United Kingdom.


Flag design
The flag is a banner of the arms of the former Middlesex County Council, abolished in 1965. Whilst such banners of county arms are legally not generally available for public use, a similar design, with Anglo-Saxon Seaxes had been used traditionally as a local badge in Middlesex and neighbouring Essex for centuries.

The pantone colours for the flag are:
Red 485
White
Yellow 116

References

Middlesex
Middlesex
Middlesex